Annenberg Hall may refer to:

 Annenberg Hall, a division of Memorial Hall at Harvard College
 Wallis Annenberg Hall, at the University of Southern California